The Romeo Historic District is a historic district roughly bounded by the corporate lines of Romeo, Michigan. It was listed on the National Register of Historic Places in 1970 and designated a Michigan State Historic Site in 1970.

History
The area around Romeo was first settled in 1821, and in 1822 the first building was constructed in what was then known as "Hoxie's Settlement."  The first piece of the present-day village, extending two blocks in each direction from the corner of St. Claire and Main Streets, was platted by Col. John B. Hollister in 1830.   By 1837 a number of simple log farmhouses dotted the area, and the settlement boasted over 200 people, 34 houses, three dry goods stores, a wagon shop, tannery, shoe shops, a foundry, a cooper shop, carpenter shop and a hoopskirt factory.  Hoxie's Settlement was incorporated as the village of Romeo in 1838.  The University of Michigan established a branch campus, the Romeo Academy, in the area in the 1840, attracting more prosperous academics and professionals to the area.  A railroad was laid through the village in 1869, bringing increased trade.  Planned growth has allowed the Romeo community to maintain a high degree of historic integrity.

Description
The Romeo Historic District contains approximately 100 well-preserved historic structures, constructed in a variety of architectural styles. Most are frame structures, including a number of Gothic Revival cottages, but the district also includes substantial brick buildings located along Romeo's main street.

References

National Register of Historic Places in Macomb County, Michigan
Historic districts on the National Register of Historic Places in Michigan
Renaissance Revival architecture in Michigan
Gothic Revival architecture in Michigan
Michigan State Historic Sites